Brusje  is a village on the island of Hvar in Croatia. New York based comedian, George Dulcich's grandparents were born in the village.

References

Hvar (city)
Populated places in Split-Dalmatia County